The Los Angeles County Metropolitan Transportation Authority (also known as "Metro", "MTA", or "LACMTA") operates a vast fleet of buses for its Metro Bus and Metro Busway services. , Metro has the third largest bus fleet in North America with 2,320 buses.

Overview
Metro and its predecessor agencies (LAMTA, 1951–64; RTD, 1964–93) have ordered buses from many manufacturers, including GM, Flxible, Grumman, AM General, Transportation Manufacturing Corporation (TMC), Neoplan USA, New Flyer Industries, ElDorado National, Orion Bus Industries, Thomas Built Buses, Blue Bird Corporation, and North American Bus Industries (NABI).

Emissions reduction
Metro has purchased buses using alternative fuels to diesel, generally consuming compressed natural gas (CNG), since the mid-1990s. The CNG fleet reduces emissions of particulates by 90%, carbon monoxide by 80%, and greenhouse gases by 20%.

In 2015, a battery electric BYD K11M demonstrator was used on the G Line. Metro has committed to move the entire fleet to zero emissions by 2030, ahead of the California Air Resources Board's Innovative Clean Transit requirement for California transit operators to transition by 2040. As a first step, the G (formerly Orange) Line will move to full zero-emissions operation by 2020, followed by the J (formerly Silver) Line as soon as possible after that. The G/Orange Line transitioned to all-electric operation by October 2021, using a fleet of 40 New Flyer Xcelsior XE60 Charge NG buses.

Vehicle technology

Metro has also increased its use of on-board vehicle technology. Many buses were equipped with monitors to display real-time bus maps to show the location through GPS navigation starting in 2004; this the first of its kind in the United States. Later, the screens began showing Transit TV broadcasts, including local news programs, starting in August 2006.

The screens were shut off and Transit TV service was discontinued in early 2015, as more passengers were relying on their personal mobile devices, such as cell phones, smartphones, and electronic tablets, for entertainment while riding the buses. The increased use of personal mobile devices by passengers led to the implementation of WiFi on all buses by April 2017. Also, as part of Metro's Advanced Transportation Management System (ATMS) project, most buses include a marquee displaying the date and time, Automatic Voice Annunciation (AVA) for audio and visual announcements of each stop, and an audio and visual "Stop Requested" announcement was added to all buses in 2008. A supplemental audio announcement of "For your safety, watch your step when exiting the bus" was added to all buses on February 28, 2013 and changed voice in March 2015.

Bus fleet

History

When it was formed in 1993, Metro inherited a large fleet of GM/TMC RTS diesel buses; these were initially replaced by Neoplan USA Transliner buses as they aged and retired. Starting in the early 2000s, the primary supplier to the Metro bus fleet was NABI, over a period of approximately 15 years. As one of its largest clients, Metro had considerable influence on NABI designs, including its bus rapid transit vehicles, the 60-BRT designed for the G Line and the composite-bodied Metro 45C, which was named after the agency and shared with Valley Metro.

After NABI’s closure in 2015, several variants of the New Flyer Xcelsior and the ENC Axess were purchased to replace the NABI fleet.

, Metro has the third largest bus fleet in North America with 2,320 buses, behind New York City's Metropolitan Transportation Authority (5,825) and New Jersey's NJ Transit (3,003). Metro operates the nation's largest fleet of compressed natural gas powered buses.

Active Fleet

On order

Retired

Liveries

Predecessors
In 1971, RTD took delivery of the first units of its Flxible New Look fleet, painted in a "Copperhead" livery which RTD described as "orange and champagne". The livery, as implemented on its GM and Flxible "New Look" fleet, had the window area painted in ochre yellow and the lower body and front painted in champagne/copper, separated by a broad silver or white stripe down the sides. When RTD introduced a 25 cent flat-fare program in 1974, some of the reserve buses pressed into service were painted a plain white instead of "Copperhead". In 1976, the existing GM Old Look bus fleet were repainted in the new "Copperhead" livery. RTD introduced an "Express" livery in 1977, colored yellow, white, and black, with a broad wedge-shaped stripe down the side.

RTD introduced the "Tri-Stripe" livery in March 1980, designed by Saul Bass and Herb Yager, starting with the existing Grumman/Flxible 870 fleet and continuing with the Rapid Transit Series scheduled for delivery in October 1980. Under this scheme, the window area was painted black and the base was painted white, separated by red, orange, and yellow stripes. The Bass/Yager firm was engaged to rebrand the agency, including a new logo, in June 1979 after the increase in ridership driven by the 1979 oil crisis proved that many residents were unfamiliar with RTD. The oldest "Old Look", which was also the first diesel bus to operate in Los Angeles starting from 1950, was retired with the delivery of the last RTS in June 1981. Most of the existing "New Look" fleet was repainted in the Bass/Yager "Tri-Stripe" livery by August 1984. "Tri-Stripe" was simplified in the early 1990s to facilitate graffiti removal.

Initial stripe schemes
Buses inherited from RTD generally carried over a simplified "RTD Tri-Stripe" livery; the base color of the bus was white (including the window area) with a triple-stacked stripe of red, orange, and yellow extending from the base of the windshield down the sides of the bus, carried below the side windows. This was simplified to "Red Stripe", white with a double-stacked stripe of red and yellow in the same position, and "Yellow Jacket" in 1997, white with a double-stacked gold stripe in the same position, featuring a stylized text logo "Metro Bus" prominently on the front and sides of the bus.

Service livery
Starting in the early 2000s, the "Metro Service" livery was implemented under the leadership of creative director Michael Lejeune and lead designer Neil Sadler. The base color of buses, visible on the lower edge and the extended roof cap for CNG storage, was  / Pantone 877 C metallic, supplemented by a broad stripe starting just below the side windows and extending to the top of the bus, denoting the service type:
 Metro Local:  / Pantone 158 C for local service
 Metro Rapid:  / Pantone 193 C for rapid (limited) service
 Metro Express:  / Pantone 286 C for express (freeway) service
 Metro Liner:  / Pantone 8401 C for bus rapid transit lines

The colors are supplemented by text restating the service type in the FF Scala Sans typeface, bold weight. This branding scheme won an honor award from the Society for Experiential Graphic Design in 2007. Since then, the Express services have been scaled back and the colors have been modified.

Updates
Typically, the supplemental text agree with the livery, such as Metro Local used with the Poppy Orange color. However as of late 2020, Metro dropped the text specification for newer buses. Instead, future buses are now simply labeled "Metro Bus" echoing the "Yellow Jacket" livery while retaining the "Service" color distinctions for local, rapid, and liner liveries.

Metro Bus & Rail divisions

Under the Metro governance structure, the routes operating out of each division are supervised by an integrated/centralized operations division with oversight provided by one of five Service Councils covering a distinct geographical region of Los Angeles County. Each Service Council has a three-letter abbreviation.

Each Service Council is composed of elected officials, appointed representatives, and transit users from a given area served by each division. While the Councils have geographical boundaries, in practice they only define where the members come from, as most of Los Angeles is served by routes operating out of multiple sectors. For instance, the former Olympic Boulevard Rapid bus was operated by buses from the San Gabriel Valley sector, despite its entire route being in the Westside or Central Los Angeles areas.

Decals with service sector abbreviations and division numbers are affixed to the windows of Metro buses.  A list of routes operating from each sector can be found in the Service Council Bylaws.

Division 3 in Cypress Park is the oldest bus yard owned by Metro, operating since 1907. About 200 buses currently operate out of the yard.

The following table lists all current bus divisions (rail divisions are not included):

Closed divisions 

The following table lists all former divisions.

See also
 
 
 Los Angeles Metro Rail rolling stock

References

External links

Liveries
  (1964–93)
  (1993–present)
 

Bus
Los Angeles bus routes
Los Angeles bus routes
Bus